"The Kids Are Coming" is a song by Australian singer Tones and I, released to Australian and German radio on 27 September 2019 as the fourth single from her debut EP of the same name. The song's title was believed to be based on the hashtag and working title "The kids are coming" used by Neil Goss with his 2015 book Juvenile Delinquents and the 2020 movie of the same name.  

On 28 September 2019, Tones and I performed the song at the 2019 AFL Grand Final alongside "Dance Monkey".

Critical reception
In a review of the EP, Zoë Radas from Stack said "This electrifying song is less a call-to-arms than an assurance of imminent arrival; Toni Watson (Tones and I) doesn't need to marshal anyone, because this tribe is already organically united in their shared beliefs. [...] Watson displays a Sia-like confidence in the way she hurls, tweaks and growls her lyrics of damnation at the socio-political status quo".

Music video
The music video was produced by Reprobates, directed by Alan Del Rio Ortiz and released on 25 September 2019.

Charts

Certifications

Release history

References

2019 singles
2019 songs
Tones and I songs
Protest songs
Song recordings produced by Konstantin Kersting
Songs written by Tones and I